A snood is a type of traditionally female headgear designed to hold the hair in a cloth or yarn bag. In the most common form, the headgear resembles a close-fitting hood worn over the back of the head. It is similar to a hairnet, but snoods typically have a looser fit, a much coarser mesh, and noticeably thicker yarn. A tighter-mesh band may cover the forehead or crown, then run behind the ears, and under the nape of the neck. A sack of sorts dangles from this band, covering and containing the fall of long hair gathered at the back. A snood sometimes was made of solid fabric, but more often of loosely knitted yarn or other net-like material. Historically (and in some cultures still in use today) a small bag of fine thread—netted, tatted, knitted, crocheted, or knotted (see macramé)—enclosed a bob of long hair on the back of the head or held it close to the nape.

Beard snood
Another similar garment which is also referred to as a snood is used to cover facial hair such as beards and moustaches when working in environments such as food production. Although it appears that "hairnet" has replaced "snood" as the common term for hair containment on the head, the term "beard snood" (essentially a "ringed scarf") is still familiar in many food production facilities.

Association football
 
Although popular for many years with European footballers like Gianluigi Buffon—in the 2010–11 Premier League season, a number of high-profile players, including Carlos Tevez and Samir Nasri, wore snoods. The fashion was derided by commentators as not manly.

Whereas former Manchester United manager Alex Ferguson said he would no longer allow his players to wear snoods, Arsenal manager Arsène Wenger defended their use, suggesting they serve a medical purpose when players have neck problems in the cold weather.

The International Football Association Board feels that snood scarves may pose a risk to a player's neck if jerked from behind. Players in the UK have been banned from wearing them during matches since 1 July 2011. IFAB had a meeting where the issue was brought up, and they were immediately and completely banned on 5 March 2011, due to not being part of the kit.

Religious use
Women's snoods are often worn by married Orthodox Jewish women, according to the religious requirement of hair covering (see Tzniut). Since these snoods are designed to cover the hair more than hold it, they are often lined to prevent them from being see-through. Contemporary hair snoods for Jewish women come in a wide range of colors and designs.

References

1860s fashion
1870s fashion
1940s fashion
Fashion accessories
Headgear
History of clothing (Western fashion)
Hoods (headgear)
Jewish religious clothing